The International Federation of Inventors' Associations (IFIA) is a non-profit, nongovernmental organization founded in London under the supervision of the United Nations, on July 11, 1968, by inventor's associations of Denmark, Finland, Germany, Great Britain, Norway, Sweden and Switzerland.

IFIA history 

IFIA was established in 1968 in London by the cooperation of the representatives of seven European countries, namely Denmark, Finland, Germany, Great Britain, Norway, Sweden and Switzerland. The IFIA is registered as one of the partners of International Geneva United Nation Office in Geneva (UNOG). The IFIA logo registered in Swiss Federal Institute of Intellectual Property. The organization has member organizations in more than 100 countries, and around 175 member organizations in total. The IFIA has a General Assembly, that includes an Executive Committee and elects the IFIA President. In 2018 the IFIA founded the Silicon Valley International Invention Festival

IFIA affiliations 
IFIA has observer status (Special Category – Technology) at the United Nations Conference on Trade and Development; observer status at the World Intellectual Property Organization (WIPO); has United Nations Industrial Development Organization's (UNIDO) consultative status; is a member of the Standing Advisory Committee before the European Patent Office (SACEPO); and is included among the Assembly of Professional Society in European Alliance for Innovation (EAI). IFIA received a grant special consultative status from the United Nations Economic and Social Council (ECOSOC) on June 6, 2019. IFIA also is Members of MIT's Solve community.

Presidents

The President shall be elected by the General Assembly for a period of four years (until the ordinary session of the General Assembly).

IFIA activities 
IFIA organizes and supports the publication of reference books, guides, surveys, studies, conferences and conventions, competitions and awards for inventions, illustrative exhibits related to inventors and inventions, and consultative services. They also sponsor the IFIA Awards, which since 2015 have including the Best Invention Medal, Ambassador Medal, and the Memorial medal. Prior awards have included the Global Golden Medal.

The Memorial Medal has been awarded to Ivo Josipoviæm, President of Croatia Teresa Stanek Rea, USPTO Acting Director Benoît Battistelli, EPO President Miklós Bendzsel, WIPO Director General Francis Gurry, and Thailand Deputy Prime Minister Prajin Juntong.

References

External links
 IFIA website
 IFIA telegram account
 IFIA Instagram account
 A grant special consultative status from the Economic and Social Council (ECOSOC)

Inventors
Non-governmental organizations
Non-profit organizations based in Europe